Victor Michael Spadaccini (March 2, 1916April 28, 1981) was a professional American football fullback in the  National Football League. He played three seasons for the Cleveland Rams. A blocking back on offense, he was primary used as a blocker and pass-catcher out of the backfield. His best season was 1939 when he caught 32 passes (a high total for that era) for 292 yards and 1 touchdown. He also did some of the Rams' point-after-touchdown kicking, converting 17 PATs over two seasons. On defense, he played defensive back and recorded 3 interceptions for his career, all accomplished in 1940. He was selected to the Pro Bowl in 1940, his final season. Vic was born and died in Minnesota and attended the University of Minnesota.

References

External links

 

1916 births
1981 deaths
American football fullbacks
Cleveland Rams players
Minnesota Golden Gophers football players
Second Air Force Superbombers football players
People from Keewatin, Minnesota
Players of American football from Minnesota
American people of Italian descent